İncə (also, Incha and Indzha) is a village and municipality in the Shaki Rayon of Azerbaijan.  It has a population of 1,281.İncə, Shaki is similar to these settlements: Sarıca, Azerbaijan, Qozlubulaq, Qaratorpaq and more.

References 

Populated places in Shaki District